The New Zealand blueback sprat (Sprattus antipodum) is a herring-like, forage fish of the family Clupeidae found in the waters around New Zealand, between latitudes 37° S and 48° S, and longitude 166° E and 180° E, to depths of up to 50 m.  It belongs to the genus Sprattus, a small oily fish usually known by their common name, sprats. Its length is up to 12 cm.

The species schools in coastal waters primarily on the bottom or midwater, with shoals of fish seen on the surface usually only in summer. It is fished mainly in subsistence fisheries and occasionally used as fishing bait.

See also
 New Zealand sprat

References

Bibliography

New Zealand blueback sprat
Endemic marine fish of New Zealand
New Zealand blueback sprat